Danbury Township is one of the twelve townships of Ottawa County, Ohio, United States.  The 2000 census found 4,631 people in the township, 3,869 of whom lived in the unincorporated portions of the township.

Communities
Danbury is an Unincorporated community located within the southwest portion of the Township on the southwest portion of the Marblehead Peninsula along the shore of the Sandusky Bay.
Lakeside is an Unincorporated community a Census Designated Place located at  along the shore of Lake Erie in the Northeast portion of the Township on the Northeast portion of the Marblehead Peninsula.The entire community is listed on the National Register of Historic Places as the Lakeside Historic District.
Lakeside Marblehead is an Unincorporated community located in the Northeast portion of the Township on the Northeast portion of the Marblehead Peninsula along the shores of Lake Erie. Lakeside Marblehead borders Lakeside and Marblehead. 

Name and history
It is the only Danbury Township statewide. This township is included in the region known as the Firelands and was originally a part of Huron County.  It was named for Danbury, Connecticut, the native home of a large share of the first settlers.

Huron County was established by the Ohio General Assembly on February 7, 1809 and, at the time, comprised present-day Erie County (except for a small piece in the west); Huron County, Ruggles Township in Ashland County, Danbury Township, and part of Catawba Island Township.

Johnson's Island, the location of a significant Prisoner-of-war camp during the Civil War, is located in Sandusky Bay just south of the Marblehead Peninsula.  It is now a part of the village of Marblehead.

Geography
Located at the eastern point of the county at the end of the Marblehead Peninsula, it borders the following townships:
Kelleys Island - northeast, across Lake Erie
Sandusky - southeast, across Sandusky Bay
Margaretta Township, Erie County - south, across Sandusky Bay
Portage Township - west
Catawba Island Township - northwest

Demographics
The median age of males is 48.0 years of age. The median age of females is 48.6 years of age.

The median income for a household in the township was $55,578 in 2008. In 1999, the median income for a household in the township was $47,434.

Government
The township is governed by a three-member board of trustees, who are elected in November of odd-numbered years to a four-year term beginning on the following January 1. Two are elected in the year after the presidential election and one is elected in the year before it. There is also an elected township fiscal officer, who serves a four-year term beginning on April 1 of the year after the election, which is held in November of the year before the presidential election. Vacancies in the fiscal officership or on the board of trustees are filled by the remaining trustees.

Notable residents
Louis C. Shepard, Medal of Honor recipient during the Civil War.

References

External links
County website

Townships in Ottawa County, Ohio
Townships in Ohio